Haleets (also called Figurehead Rock) is a sandstone glacial erratic boulder with inscribed petroglyphs on Bainbridge Island, Washington. The Native American Suquamish Tribe claims the rock, on a public beach at Agate Point on the shore of Agate Passage, as part of their heritage. The exact date the petroglyphs were carved is unknown but is estimated to be around 1000 BCE to 400 or 500 CE, the latest date being when labrets (worn by one of the petroglyph figures) were no longer used by Coast Salish peoples.

Haleets is the Coast Salish name of the rock, also transcribed as Halelos, Xalelos and Xalilc, meaning "marked face". It is known in English as Figurehead Rock. Its purpose is unknown but the Suquamish Museum curator and archivist Charlie Sigo has stated that it may have been a boundary marker. An amateur astronomer has proposed a theory that it has a calendrical function (see Archaeoastronomy).

Some sources say that the rock is one of three prominent Salish Sea petroglyphs that were always on the shoreline, but tectonic activity around the Seattle Fault may have put Haleets in the intertidal zone.

Footnotes

References

Sources

External links 

Petroglyphs in Washington (state)
Glacial erratics of Washington (state)
Bainbridge Island, Washington
Coast Salish art
Archaeoastronomy
Individual rocks